= Hangarki =

Coordinates: 15°36′N 74°56′E

- Village
- Interactive map of Hangarki
- Country: India
- State: Karnataka
- District: Dharwad

Government
  - Body: Village Panchayat

Population (2011)
  - Total: 2,248

Languages
  - Official: Kannada
- Time zone: UTC+5:30 (IST)
- ISO 3166 code: IN-KA
- Vehicle registration: KA
- Website: karnataka.gov.in

Hangarki is a village in Dharwad district of Karnataka, India.

== Demographics ==
As of the 2011 Census of India there were 445 households in Hangarki and a total population of 2,248 consisting of 1,140 males and 1,108 females. There were 285 children ages 0–6.
